Tobias Rathgeb (born 3 May 1982, in Ostfildern) is a German retired football midfielder.

Career
On 6 January 2010, his contract with FC Hansa Rostock was terminated. One day later, he returned to the second team of VfB Stuttgart.

References

External links
 Tobias Rathgeb at kicker.de 
 
 

1982 births
Living people
German footballers
Footballers from Baden-Württemberg
FC Hansa Rostock players
VfB Stuttgart II players
Bundesliga players
2. Bundesliga players
3. Liga players
Regionalliga players
Association football midfielders
VfL Kirchheim/Teck players